Dwayne Simpson (born 12 February 1981) is a former  Australian rules footballer who played for the Fremantle Dockers in 2001. He was originally drafted by the Sydney Swans from East Fremantle in the WAFL with selection 59 in the 1998 AFL Draft but did not play a league game for them. At the end of the 2000 season he was traded back to West Australia in return for the 52nd selection.  He played two games for Fremantle in 2001 before being delisted at the end of the season.

Originally from Mullewa in the Mid West region of Western Australia, he is the nephew of actor Ernie Dingo.

References

External links

1981 births
Fremantle Football Club players
East Fremantle Football Club players
Living people
Australian rules footballers from Western Australia
Indigenous Australian players of Australian rules football
People from Mullewa, Western Australia